The 2008 V8 Supercar season was the twelfth season in which V8 Supercars contested the premier Australian touring car racing series. It was the 49th year of touring car racing in Australia since the first running of the Australian Touring Car Championship, known today as the V8 Supercar Championship Series, and of the fore-runner of the present day Bathurst 1000, the Armstrong 500.

The season began on 21 February at the Clipsal 500 on the streets of Adelaide and finished on 7 December at Oran Park Raceway. 2008 featured the twelfth V8 Supercars Championship Series, consisting of 14 rounds covering all states and the Northern Territory of Australia as well as rounds in New Zealand and Bahrain. It also featured a non-championship event supporting the 2008 Australian Grand Prix. It included the ninth second tier Development Series, this year referred to as the Fujitsu V8 Supercar Series. All bar one of the seven rounds were held as a support category for the V8 Supercar Championship Series. For the first time a third tier series was run, known as the Shannons V8 Touring Car National Series. Its four rounds were held as part of the Shannons Nationals Motor Racing Championships.

Race calendar

* – fastest lap of official pre-season test days
VSC – V8 Supercar Championship Series
FVS – Fujitsu V8 Supercar Series
STCS – Shannons V8 Touring Car National Series
NC – Non-championship event

V8 Supercar Championship Series

Sprint Gas V8 Supercars Manufacturers Challenge

Fujitsu V8 Supercar Series

Shannons V8 Touring Car National Series

References

Linked articles contain additional references.

External links
 Official V8 Supercar website
 2008 Racing Results Archive

Supercar seasons
 

sv:V8 Supercar 2008